Juan Ramón Cazares Sevillano (born 3 April 1992) is an Ecuadorian footballer who plays as an attacking midfielder for Argentine Primera División club Independiente, on loan from Ukrainian club Metalist Kharkiv.

Club career

Youth career
Born in Quinindé, Esmeraldas, Cazares moved to Guayaquil at early age and joined Barcelona's youth setup in 2006, aged 14. After being rarely used, he moved to Norte América in 2009, and subsequently joined Independiente José Terán later in the same year.

At Independiente, Cazares made his senior debut in 2009 Ecuadorian Serie B, appearing in nine matches and scoring one goal on 6 September, in a 4–0 home routing of Municipal Cañar.

River Plate
In January 2010, Cazares was loaned to River Plate. Initially assigned to the reserves, he impressed enough to secure a permanent contract in August of the following year. River paid Independiente US$ 500,000 for 50% of his rights, with a further one million in a future sale.

Cazares made his first team debut for River on 7 December 2011, coming on as a late substitute for goalscorer Chori Domínguez in a 1–0 Copa Argentina home win against Defensores de Belgrano; he became the first Ecuadorian to play for the club. In 2012, after establishing himself as a starter for the B-side, he won the 2012 U-20 Copa Libertadores and was also elected the tournament's best player.

Cazares was called up to train with the first team for ahead of the 2012–13 campaign by manager Matías Almeyda. He made his Primera División debut on 26 August 2012, replacing Manuel Lanzini in a 0–0 draw home draw against San Lorenzo.

Cazares was made a starter in the following matchday, a 1–1 draw at Colón on 2 September. After the sacking of Almeyda and the appointment of Ramón Díaz, he was not utilized by the club and subsequently placed in the loan list.

Barcelona (loan)
On 25 February 2013, Cazares was loaned to his first club Barcelona for six months. He made his debut for his childhood club on 10 March, coming on as an 80th-minute substitute for José Ayoví in a 1–0 home win against Macará.

Cazares only made one further appearance for Barcelona, starting in a 1–2 loss at El Nacional on 21 April 2013, before returning to River in July.

Banfield (loan)
On 10 July 2013, Cazares was loaned to Primera B Nacional side Banfield for one year, reuniting with his former River manager Almeyda. He made his debut for the club on 5 August, starting in a 1–1 away draw against Almirante Brown.

Cazares scored his first goals abroad on 7 December 2013, netting a brace in a 4–2 home win against Unión de Santa Fe. He finished the season as an undisputed starter, scoring four goals in 38 appearances as his side achieved a top tier promotion as champions.

In July 2014, Cazares' loan was renewed for a further 18 months, with Banfield having a 1.5 million buyout clause for the remaining 50% of his rights (which belonged to Independiente). He scored his first goal in the main category of Argentine football on 24 August, netting the last in a 2–0 away success over San Lorenzo.

Atlético Mineiro

2016
On 27 December 2016, Cazares agreed to join Série A club Atlético Mineiro, who paid 1.5 million dollars for 50% of his rights directly to Independiente. Presented the following 4 January, he had to wait until 23 February to be registered due to bureaucratic problems involving his previous clubs.

Cazares made his debut for Galo on 24 February 2016, starting in a 1–0 home win against former club Independiente for the year's Copa Libertadores. He scored his first goal for the club on 17 March, in a 3–0 home success over Colo-Colo for the same competition.

Cazares also scored Atlético's first goal in 2016 Campeonato Brasileiro Série A, in a 1–0 win against Santos. Returning from the Copa América Centenario in June, he scored goals against both Ponte Preta (3–0 home win) and Corinthians (2–1 home win); late in the month, he scored a double in a 5–3 home success over Botafogo, taking his tally up to six goals in only six league matches.

After establishing himself as a starter, Cazares suffered a thigh injury, which kept him out for nearly a month. On 7 December 2016, during the 2016 Copa do Brasil Finals, he scored from his own half to equalize the second leg against Grêmio. The match, however, ended 1–1 and his side finished runners-up after a 3–1 defeat in the first leg.

Cazares finished the year with ten goals in all competitions, being the club's fourth top goalscorer (behind Robinho, Lucas Pratto and Fred, respectively) and the best in the midfield position.

2017
Cazares scored his first goal of 2017 on April 27 in a 2017 Copa Libertadores 2–0 home victory against Paraguayan club Libertad. His first brace came on May 4, in a 5–1 away victory against Bolivian club Sport Boys. On May 7 Cazares assisted the winning goal in a 2–1 victory against rivals Cruzeiro, winning his first trophy with the club. On May 16, Cazares scored a brace against Godoy Cruz to win the home match 4–1, qualifying Atletico Mineiro in the top–spot of Group 6. On June 18, Cazares scored a goal against giants Sao Paulo FC, winning their first match of the league 2–1. Cazares scored his first Copa do Brasil goal of 2017 on June 30 against Botafogo winning the first–leg match 1–0. On July 2, Cazares scored his first goal ever against club rivals Cruzeiro, winning 3–1.

Corinthians
On 26 September 2020, Cazares agreed to join Corinthians in a free transfer after he rescinded his contract with Atlético. He signed a nine-month contract with the club.

International career
Cazares represented Ecuador under-20s in 2011 South American U-20 Championship and 2011 FIFA U-20 World Cup, scoring a goal against Colombia in the former tournament. On 6 September 2014 he made his debut for the full squad, starting and scoring the second in a 4–0 friendly win against Bolivia.

Cazares continued to appear regularly for the national team in the following years, being called up to 2015 Copa América and Copa América Centenario.

Career statistics

Club

National team

International goals

Honours

Club
Banfield
Primera B Nacional: 2013–14

Atlético Mineiro
Campeonato Mineiro: 2017

References

External links
FEF player profile

1992 births
Living people
People from Quinindé Canton
Ecuadorian footballers
Ecuadorian expatriate footballers
Ecuador international footballers
Association football midfielders
2015 Copa América players
Copa América Centenario players
Ecuadorian Serie A players
C.S.D. Independiente del Valle footballers
Barcelona S.C. footballers
Club Atlético River Plate footballers
Club Atlético Banfield footballers
Clube Atlético Mineiro players
Sport Club Corinthians Paulista players
Fluminense FC players
FC Metalist Kharkiv players
Club Atlético Independiente footballers
Argentine Primera División players
Primera Nacional players
Campeonato Brasileiro Série A players
Ecuadorian expatriate sportspeople in Argentina
Ecuadorian expatriate sportspeople in Brazil
Ecuadorian expatriate sportspeople in Ukraine
Expatriate footballers in Argentina
Expatriate footballers in Brazil
Expatriate footballers in Ukraine
C.S. Norte América footballers